Federico Echave Musatadi (born 20 July 1960 in Kortezubi) is a Spanish former professional road bicycle racer. He won the prestigious stage up to Alpe d'Huez in 1987 Tour de France. Echave holds the record for most Vueltas finished, 14, all of them being consecutive.

Major results 
Sources:

1981
 2nd Circuito de Getxo
 9th Klasika Primavera
 10th Costa del Azahar
1982
 1st Stage 1, Vuelta a Cantabria
 1st GP Caboalles de Abajo
 3rd Road race, National Road Championships
 3rd GP Pascuas
 6th Overall Vuelta a La Rioja
 8th Clásica de San Sebastián
 9th Trofeo Masferrer
1983
 1st Stages 1 (ITT) & 2 (TTT), Vuelta a Asturias
 8th Overall Vuelta a La Rioja
1st Stage 2 TTT
1984
 1st Overall Vuelta a Burgos
1st Points classification
1st Stages 3 and 4a 
 6th Overall Ruota d'Oro
1st Stage 4
 7th Overall
1st Stage 2 (TTT)
1985
 1st Klasika Primavera
 1st Stage 5, Vuelta a España
 1st Stage 4, Vuelta a Andalucía
 1st Stage 2, Volta a la Comunitat Valenciana
 1st Prologue, Vuelta a los Valles Mineros 
 1st Stage 1, Volta a Galicia
 6th Overall  Vuelta a La Rioja
1st Stage 2
1986
 1st Klasika Primavera
 1st Stage 8, Volta a Catalunya
 1st Stage 2, Vuelta a Cantabria
1987
 1st Stage 20, Tour de France
 1st Circuito de Getxo
 3rd Clásica de San Sebastián
 5th Overall Vuelta a Asturias 
1st Stage 2
1988
 1st Overall Vuelta a La Rioja
1st Mountain classification
 1st Overall Vuelta a los Valles Mineros
1st Points classification
1st Stage 3
 1st Stage 3 (TTT) Vuelta a España
 2nd Overall Vuelta a Asturias
1st Stage 4
1989
 1st Overall Vuelta a Castilla y León
 1st Overall Bicicleta Eibarresa
1st Stage 1
 2nd Overall Itzulia Basque Country
1st Points classification
 4th Overall Vuelta a España
 10th Overall Tour de l'Avenir
1990
 1st Overall  Tour of Galicia
 5th Overall Giro d'Italia
 5th Giro di Lombardia
 6th Overall Vuelta a España
1st Stage 17
1991
 1st Stage 3, Volta a la Comunitat Valenciana
 4th Overall Vuelta a España
 7th Overall Vuelta a Burgos
1992
 1st Grand Prix des Amériques
 1st Klasika Primavera
 5th Overall Vuelta a España
 6th Overall Volta Catalunya
1993
 1st Stage 2, Tour of the Basque Country
 1st Subida al Txitxarro
 3rd Overall Vuelta a Mallorca
1st Stage 5
1996
 9th Overall Tour DuPont

General classification results timeline

References

External links
 Federico Echave Palmarès by urtekaria.com  
 

Spanish Tour de France stage winners
Spanish Vuelta a España stage winners
Cyclists from the Basque Country (autonomous community)
Spanish male cyclists
1960 births
Living people
People from Busturialdea
Sportspeople from Biscay